Matthias Dunkel (born 6 May 1961) is a German sports shooter. He competed in the mixed skeet event at the 1992 Summer Olympics.

References

External links
 

1961 births
Living people
German male sport shooters
Olympic shooters of Germany
Shooters at the 1992 Summer Olympics
People from Erzgebirgskreis
Sportspeople from Saxony